The Independent Socialist Party was a political party in Turkey. The party was founded in the summer of 1922 by the trade unionist leader Rasim Sakir, after a split from the Socialist Party of Turkey.

The party was a member of the Labour and Socialist International.

References

Defunct socialist parties in Turkey
Political parties established in 1922
Members of the Labour and Socialist International
1922 establishments in the Ottoman Empire